Gerechtigkeitsbrunnen means "fountain of justice" in German and may refer to:

 Gerechtigkeitsbrunnen (Berne), a 1543 fountain in Berne
 Gerechtigkeitsbrunnen (Frankfurt), a 1541 fountain in Frankfurt